Trachelipus remyi is a species of woodlouse in the genus Trachelipus belonging to the family Trachelipodidae that can be found in former Yugoslavian states such as Kosovo, Montenegro, and Serbia.

References

Trachelipodidae
Woodlice of Europe
Crustaceans described in 1933